Lil Italy (born September 8, 1973) is an American rapper who began his career as G-Note of California rap group Funk Mobb, who were signed to E-40's label Sick With It Records from 1994 to 1998, when the group disbanded.

He joined No Limit Records in 1998 under the new stage name of Lil Italy, and released his first and only album with No Limit, On Top of da World, in 1999. The record peaked at #99 on the Billboard 200 and #20 on the Top R&B/Hip-Hop Albums chart, and featured guest appearances from the likes of Silkk the Shocker, Snoop Dogg, and Magic, but Lil Italy was soon dropped from the label due to poor sales.

Lil Italy's second album, Full Blown, was distributed by independent label K-Lou in 2001, but it did not chart. In 2011, he returned after a decade-long hiatus with the new release My Life, which is only available as an MP3 download.

He was born to American parents.

Discography

Studio albums

Collaboration albums
It Ain't 4 Play with Funk Mobb (1996)

Singles

References

African-American male rappers
West Coast hip hop musicians
No Limit Records artists
Living people
Rappers from California
Gangsta rappers
American people of Jamaican descent
1962 births
21st-century American rappers
21st-century American male musicians
21st-century African-American musicians
20th-century African-American people